War of the Maidens (German: Der Jungfrauenkrieg) is a 1957 Austrian-German comedy film directed by Hermann Kugelstadt and starring Oskar Sima, Kurt Heintel and Mady Rahl. It was shot at the Schönbrunn Studios in Vienna and at the studios in Salzburg. The film's sets were designed by the art director Wolf Witzemann.

Cast

References

Bibliography 
 Robert von Dassanowsky. Austrian Cinema: A History. McFarland, 2005.

External links 
 

1957 films
1957 comedy films
Austrian comedy films
German comedy films
West German films
1950s German-language films
Films directed by Hermann Kugelstadt
Schönbrunn Studios films
Sascha-Film films
1950s German films